Antonio/Antoni Chłapowski  (born December 31, 1943 in Lwów, Poland) is a sportsperson.

He is a descendant of Dezydery Chłapowski. Chłapowski has both Polish and Swedish citizenship.

Formula Ford career 
Chłapowski's was the first sport was Formula Ford. He won the Danish championship, and came second in the Swedish championship and the championship of the Benelux countries. Antonio also qualified to second place in the final of the 1972 World Championships.

Some of the Swedish competition results in Formula Ford

Equestrian career 

Eventually Chłapowski gave up his auto racing career to move to horses. Upon Chłapowski's graduation from the renowned Swedish education for Riding instructors at Strömsholm he received the highest instructor level, RIK III.

Chłapowski continued his sports career as a member of the Swedish equestrian team. For many years he competed against and trained with riders like Jan Mathausen, Thomas and Markus Fuchs, Wilhelm Melliger, Stanny van Paesschen and Helen and Peter Weinberg. Chłapowski is now an outstanding coach and also a professional farrier. Chłapowskis dream is to make riding to the Polish national sport.

Company in Poland 
1995 bought Chłapowski a decaying state-owned farm in Jaszkowo and founded the Centrum Hipiki. It has since the takeover renovated and built the Centre Hipiki Jaszkowo and continues so. Already in 2004,  was Centrum Hipiki Jaszkowo classified by the FEI as one of the largest education and competition center  in Europe for horses, ponies and riders, as well as one of Europe's biggest pony center. Antonio is strong devotee task of educating children, adolescents and adults in all aspects of riding to do.

Centrum Hipiki has twice hosted the European Pony Championship, at Jaszkowo, south of the city of Poznań.

References

External links 
 FEI before Pony EM 2004
 Swedish Equestrian about Pony EM 2011

Living people
Polish motorsport people
1943 births
Sportspeople from Lviv
Polish male equestrians